Summer's Desire is a 2016 Chinese romantic drama film directed by Lai Chun-Yu and starring Cancan Huang, Him Law and Jerry Yan. It was released in China on July 21, 2016.

Plot
Yin Xiamo was attracted to Luo Xi because they were both orphans. However, Yin Xiamo's rich boyfriend Ou Chen sent Luo Xi to UK to separate the two. After a fatal car accident involving Yin Xiamo's adoptive parents, Yin Xiamo blamed everything on Ou Chen, leading him to lose his memory in a car accident. Five years later, Luo Xi became a popular actor and decided to win back Yin Xiamo. Yet, Ou Chen started recovering his memory and eventually remembered Yin Xiamo.

Cast
Cancan Huang
Him Law
Jerry Yan
Jiu Kong
Gua Ah-leh

Reception
The film has grossed  in China.

References

Chinese romantic drama films
2016 romantic drama films
China Film Group Corporation films
Films based on Chinese novels
Summer's Desire
2010s Mandarin-language films